Ivan Nikitich Zimin (1818-1887) was a Russian industrialist who developed Drezna as a mill town.

His sons, Sergei and Grigory Zimin inherited his business, but his wife, Evdokia Savvateevna, remained an active participant in the management of company business.

He was buried in the Preobrazhenskoye Cemetery.

References

1818 births
1887 deaths
19th-century businesspeople from the Russian Empire